The Longest Meow is the third studio album by American singer-songwriter Bobby Bare Jr. The album, released on September 26, 2006, came two years after his previous studio album From the End of Your Leash, and continues Bare's eccentric and experimental style. The 11-track album was recorded during one 11-hour session in Nashville on March 26, 2006 with musicians from My Morning Jacket, Lambchop, Trail of Dead, and Clem Snide. The album primarily is a mixture of alternative country and indie rock, though also employs elements from other genres. The reception from critics was generally positive, with reviewers admiring Bare for his unconventional approach to music, though still noting that parts of the album seemed rushed as a result of time constraints.

Track listing 
All writing by Bobby Bare Jr. except where noted.

Personnel 
 Bobby Bare Jr. – guitar, vocals
 Carl Broemel – guitar, keyboard
 Brad Jones – bass guitar, organ, sound engineering
 Patrick Hallahan – drums
 Doni Schroader – keyboard, percussion, vibraphone
 Jim James – harmonica, vocals
 Cory Younts – keyboard, vocals 
 Carey Kotsionis – vocals
 Benny Martin – percussion
 Neal Rosengarden – trumpet
 Deanna Varagona – saxophone, vocals
 Jim DeMain & Leslie Richter – sound engineering

Notes

External links 
 The Longest Meow at Bloodshot Records
 The Longest Meow at Bandcamp

References 

2006 albums
Bobby Bare Jr. albums